Ian Shaw (born 25 April 1968) is a British sport shooter. He competed for Scotland in the Queen's prize pairs event at the 2014 Commonwealth Games where he won a bronze medal.

References

1968 births
Scottish male sport shooters
Commonwealth Games bronze medallists for Scotland
Living people
Shooters at the 2014 Commonwealth Games
Commonwealth Games silver medallists for Scotland
Commonwealth Games medallists in shooting
British male sport shooters
Medallists at the 2014 Commonwealth Games